In the Japanese writing system  are ligatures in the kana writing system, both hiragana and katakana. 

Hardly any kana ligatures or polysyllabic kana are represented in standard character encodings.

History

These characters were widely used until a spelling reform of 1900 decreed that each sound (mora) would be represented by one (kana) character. They were not represented in computer character encodings until JIS X 0213:2000 (JIS2000) added yori and koto.

List

Hiragana ligature

Polysyllabic hiragana

Katakana ligature

Polysyllabic katakana

In Unicode

See also

 Yori (kana)

References 

Kana
Typographic ligatures